Luke Clement Sela, OBE (died 6 June 2007) was a journalist and newspaper editor from Papua New Guinea.  He served as editor of the Papua New Guinea Post-Courier newspaper, one of PNG's largest publications, from 1978 to 1992, and was described by the newspaper as a champion of the free press in the country.

Career
Sela worked in the Papua information services in the 1960s and 1970s. 
He was a journalist at the radio stations Radio Wewak and ABC Australia. He joined the staff of the Post-Courier in 1976 and became the editor in 1978, the newspaper's first national editor. He remained editor until 1992, and retired in 2000, but continued to work with the Post-Courier after his retirement. He was preparing to help coordinate the newspaper's coverage of the 2007 elections in PNG's island regions at the time of his death.

Personal life
Sela was married to Nia; they had two children.

Sela died on 6 June 2007, at Lorengau General Hospital in his home province of Manus, at the age of 64.

Awards and honours
He was awarded the OBE in 1986 for services to journalism. In 2000, the headquarters of the Post-Courier was named Sela Haus in his honour. In 2020, he was the subject of a commemorative stamp.

References

Year of birth missing
2007 deaths
Papua New Guinean newspaper editors
People from Manus Province
Papua New Guinean journalists